The 1944 Wisconsin gubernatorial election was held on November 7, 1944.

Incumbent Republican Governor Walter Samuel Goodland defeated Democratic nominee Daniel Hoan with 52.84% of the vote.

Primary elections
Primary elections were held on August 15, 1944.

Democratic primary

Candidates
Daniel Hoan, former mayor of Milwaukee
John N. Zimmermann, purchasing agent

Results

Republican primary

Candidates
Walter Samuel Goodland, incumbent governor
Roland E. Kannenberg, former State Senator
Delbert J. Kenny, businessman
Milton T. Murray, State Senator and unsuccessful candidate for Republican nomination for governor in 1942
Christian J. Otjen, lawyer and soldier

Results

Progressive primary

Candidates
Ralph F. Amoth
Alexander O. Benz, president of the Aid Association for Lutherans
John H. Kaiser, Progressive candidate for Secretary of State in 1942
Leo E. Vaudreuil, former Deputy Attorney General of Wisconsin

Results

General election

Candidates
Major party candidates
Walter Samuel Goodland, Democratic
Daniel Hoan, Republican
Alexander O. Benz, Progressive

Other candidates
Georgia Cozzini, Socialist Labor, candidate for governor in 1942
George A. Nelson, Socialist, candidate for governor in 1934

Results

References

Bibliography
 
 

1944
Wisconsin
Gubernatorial
November 1944 events